Philippe Hannibal Price was a Haitian diplomat and author.

After the fall of President Michel Domingue, Price became a Counselor to the Provisional Government of 1875 and was a serious advocate of Florvil Hyppolite.

From 1890 to 1893 he served as Minister Plenipotentiary to Washington, D.C. It was during this time that he wrote his most famous book, De la Réhabilitation de la Race Noire par la République d'Haïti, published in 1893. Price died in Baltimore, Maryland of typhoid fever at the age of fifty-two.

Selected works 

 Etudes sur Les Finances et L'Économie des Nations 
 Rapport sur Les Traveaux de la Première Conférence Pan-Américaine
 De La Réhabilitation de La Race noire et de La Republique D'Haïti (published 1893)

References

 
 | coauthors = Dantès Bellegarde, A. Duval, Georges Sylvain

1841 births
1893 deaths
Ambassadors of Haiti to the United States
Haitian non-fiction writers
Haitian male writers
People from Jacmel
Male non-fiction writers